Deroxena venosulella is a moth of the family Autostichidae. It is found in Liechtenstein, France, Italy, Austria, Slovakia, Hungary, Romania, Greece and Russia.

The wingspan is about 19–24 mm. The forewings are yellowish and the hindwings are shining whitish sprinkled with brown.

Subspecies
Deroxena venosulella venosulella
Deroxena venosulella gallica Fischer, 1949
Deroxena venosulella neglectella (Lederer, 1863)

References

Moths described in 1862
Autostichinae
Moths of Europe
Insects of Turkey